Devin B. Terhune is a cognitive neuroscientist, a Reader (Associate Professor) at King's College London, director of its TAS Laboratory and frequent public speaker. He is primarily known for his work on suggestion, time perception, hypnosis, and different features of awareness, as well as his public lectures on these subjects.

His contributions to the field of neuroscience have earned him a number of awards, grants, and honors from the BBSRC, the Bial Foundation, the Cogito Foundation, the European Commission, the Gyllenbergs Foundation, and the Templeton Foundation. His research has also been covered by major national and international news outlets such as the New York Times, The Guardian, New Scientist, ABC News, and Science Magazine.

Biography
Terhune began his academic career by obtaining a bachelor's degree in psychology and an honours degree in Philosophy from Concordia University in Montreal, Canada in 2003. He went on to obtain a master's degree in psychology from the University of Liverpool a year later, and then became a research assistant at Boston University's Department of Psychiatry.

Terhune left that position to begin a PhD in psychology from Lund University, which completed in 2010. He then became a postdoctoral research fellow at the University of Oxford's Department of Experimental Psychology, where he published notable papers on synesthesia working alongside Roi Cohen Kadosh.

From 2015 to 2022, he lectured in statistics and coding at Goldsmiths, University of London. As of 2022, Terhune is a Reader at King's College London, heads the institution's Timing Awareness and Suggestion Laboratory. During his time, he has increased his public outreach, both by authoring articles in various publications and giving numerous public lectures.

Selected publications
Devin Terhune has an extensive publication record. A selection of works are listed below:

References

External links

 Goldsmiths Profile page

Living people
Academics of the University of London
Academics of the University of Oxford
Year of birth missing (living people)
Place of birth missing (living people)
Alumni of the University of Liverpool
Lund University alumni